Geoffrey MacKay Crain (December 15, 1930 – October 25, 1998) was a Canadian football player who played for the Ottawa Rough Riders and Winnipeg Blue Bombers. Born in New York, Crain and his parents moved back to Canada when he was two years old. He played football previously at McGill University before his pro career.

References

1930 births
1998 deaths
Canadian football quarterbacks
McGill Redbirds football players
Winnipeg Blue Bombers players
Ottawa Rough Riders players
Canadian players of Canadian football
American players of Canadian football
Sportspeople from Rochester, New York
American emigrants to Canada